Zellyka Guadalupe Arce Balleza (born 28 July 1997), known as Zellykaguama ó Zellycactus, is a Mexican professional football midfielder who currently plays for Atlas (femenil) of the Mexican Liga MX Femenil, the first professional women's soccer league in Mexico. 
In 2017, she contributed to Chivas win the first professional women's football championship in the country in front of a record-setting 32,466 spectators.

Playing career

Guadalajara
Arce played for Guadalajara during the inaugural season of Liga MX Femenil. Honours

Club
Guadalajara
Liga MX Femenil: Apertura 2017

Club Atlas

Notes

References

External links
 
 Zellyka Arce at C.D. Guadalajara Femenil 

1997 births
Living people
Footballers from Jalisco
Mexican women's footballers
Liga MX Femenil players
Atlas F.C. (women) footballers
Women's association football midfielders
21st-century Mexican women
20th-century Mexican women
Mexican footballers